Enarotali Airport  is an airport in Enarotali, Central Papua, Indonesia. The airport serves the town of Enarotal in Paniai Regency as well as the surrounding regencies. The airport has a single runway of 1,012 m x 18 m and an apron of 40 m x 70 m, which can only accommodate small aircraft such as the DHC-6 Twin Otter.

References

Airports in Central Papua